Jean-Frédéric Chapuis (born 2 March 1989) is a French freestyle skier. He won the gold medal at the 2013 FIS Freestyle World Ski Championships in ski cross. He repeated his success in the 2014 Winter Olympic Games with a gold medal.

References

External links
 
 
 
 
 

1989 births
Living people
French male freestyle skiers
Freestyle skiers at the 2014 Winter Olympics
Freestyle skiers at the 2018 Winter Olympics
Freestyle skiers at the 2022 Winter Olympics
Olympic freestyle skiers of France
Olympic gold medalists for France
Olympic medalists in freestyle skiing
Medalists at the 2014 Winter Olympics
People from Bourg-Saint-Maurice
Sportspeople from Savoie